Somethin' Bout Love is the third studio album of keyboardist Brian Culbertson released in 1999 on Atlantic/WEA Records. The album reached No. 3 on the Billboard Contemporary Jazz Albums chart and No. 8 on the Billboard Top Jazz Albums chart.

Singles
Get'n Over You got to No. 16 on the Billboard Adult R&B Songs chart. I'm Gonna Miss You also reached No. 21 on the Billboard Adult R&B Songs chart.

Tracklisting

References

1999 albums
Atlantic Records albums